South Carolina Highway 35 (SC 35) is a  state highway in the U.S. state of South Carolina. The highway connects the southern part of Cayce and West Columbia.

Route description
SC 35 begins at an interchange with Interstate 77 (I-77) in the southern part of Cayce. Here, the roadway continues as 12th Street Extension. It travels to the north and goes through the Saxe Gotha Industrial Park. It crosses over Congaree Creek on an unnamed bridge and passes the Cyril B. Busbee Middle School. It has an intersection with SC 2 (Frink Street) and transitions to 12th Street. A few blocks after an intersection with U.S. Route 21 (US 21)/US 176/US 321 (Knox Abbot Drive), the highway leaves Cayce and enters West Columbia. SC 35 then intersects US 1 (Augusta Road/Meeting Street). About two blocks later, the highway meets SC 12 (Jarvis Klapman Boulevard). Approximately  later, it meets its northern terminus, an intersection with US 378 (Sunset Boulevard). Here, the roadway continues as Seminole Drive.

Major intersections

See also

References

External links

SC 35 - South Carolina Hwy Index

035
Transportation in Lexington County, South Carolina